Chou Hsi-wei (born 11 March 1958) Taiwanese politician. He was a member of the Legislative Yuan from 1999 to 2005. He then served as Taipei County Magistrate from 2005 to 2010.

Chou worked for James Soong and was a member of Soong's People First Party until joining the Kuomintang in 2005.

Education 
Chou earned his bachelor's degree in business administration from Fu Jen Catholic University and master's degree in business administration and public administration from University of Southern California in the United States.

Political career 
Chou served two terms on the Legislative Yuan before he was elected as the Magistrate of Taipei County in the 2005 Republic of China local election held on 3 December 2005 and took office on 20 December 2005. In October 2017, Chou declared his candidacy for the New Taipei mayoralty. He registered for the Kuomintang mayoral primary in March 2018. In February 2019, Chou announced his bid for the 2020 Kuomintang presidential nomination.

Notes 

1958 births
Kuomintang Members of the Legislative Yuan in Taiwan
Living people
Fu Jen Catholic University alumni
People First Party Members of the Legislative Yuan
Politicians of the Republic of China on Taiwan from Changhua County
Members of the 4th Legislative Yuan
Members of the 5th Legislative Yuan
New Taipei Members of the Legislative Yuan
Magistrates of Taipei County
Anti-Japanese sentiment in Taiwan